Jordyn Nicole Listro (born August 10, 1995) is a Canadian professional soccer player who plays as a midfielder for Orlando Pride of the National Women's Soccer League (NWSL) and the Canada national team.

Early life 
Born in Toronto, Canada, Listro was a standout soccer player at Bayview Glen School and was awarded team MVP 2009–11. She played club soccer for Wexford SC and the Ontario Soccer National Training Centre as a youth, later playing for Toronto Lady Lynx in the USL W-League and Sanjaxx Lions in League1 Ontario.

College career 
Listro played college soccer at the University of South Florida while majoring in health sciences. She was a four-year starter for the South Florida Bulls between 2013 and 2016, becoming the program's record appearance maker with 82. As a senior she was named to the AAC All-Conference Second Team.

Professional career

UDG Tenerife 
Listro entered the 2017 NWSL College Draft but was not selected. In June 2017, she signed with Spanish Primera División team UDG Tenerife. Listro made her professional debut starting in a 1–1 with Rayo Vallecano on September 3, 2017. She made a total of five appearances for the team before departing in November 2017, returning to Canada for personal reasons.

Orlando Pride 
After a spell working as a medical sales representative, Listro attempted to make a return to professional soccer and was a trialist with Orlando Pride during 2020 preseason. With the season disrupted by the COVID-19 pandemic, Listro was one of seven players signed to a short-term contract with Orlando in order to compete in the Fall Series in September following the team's decision to loan out 11 senior players to play regularly overseas. She made her debut on September 19, 2020, in the first fall series match, starting in a 0–0 draw with North Carolina Courage. She started in three of the four Fall Series matches for a combined 262 minutes. Ahead of the 2021 season, Listro re-signed with the club on a one-year deal with an option for an additional season.

Kansas City Current 
On March 30, 2021, Listro was traded to expansion side Kansas City NWSL (later renamed Kansas City Current) in exchange for a third-round pick in 2022 NWSL Draft, changing to a second-round pick should certain conditions be met. On December 8, 2021, it was announced Listro had been released as part of the team's offseason roster moves.

North Carolina Courage 
On December 14, 2021, Listro was selected off the waiver wire by the North Carolina Courage. In March 2022, she was released prior to the start of the season having not been named to the final roster.

Orlando Pride 
On May 7, 2022, it was announced Listro had rejoined Orlando Pride for the remainder of the 2022 season.

International 
As well as Canada, Listro was also eligible to represent Italy at international level, the birthplace of her grandparents.

In 2012, Listro was named to the Canada under-17 squad for the 2012 FIFA U-17 Women's World Cup held in Azerbaijan. She made one appearance at the tournament, as a substitute in the opening game against Nigeria.

After Canada Soccer had dropped contact with Listro when she went to college, she received her first senior national team call-up in January 2021 for a training camp ahead of the 2021 SheBelieves Cup. She was one of six uncapped players named to incoming head coach Bev Priestman's first squad. Listro made her senior international debut on February 21, starting in the second game of the tournament and playing 61 minutes of a 1–0 win over Argentina.

Personal life 
In November 2021, Listro got engaged to fellow University of South Florida alumnus and professional golfer Cristian DiMarco. The pair had started dating in March 2017.

Career statistics

Club 
.

International

References

External links 
 South Florida Bulls profile
 
 

1995 births
Living people
Canadian people of Italian descent
Soccer players from Toronto
Canadian women's soccer players
Canada women's international soccer players
Women's association football midfielders
USL W-League (1995–2015) players
League1 Ontario (women) players
South Florida Bulls women's soccer players
Canadian expatriate sportspeople in Spain
Expatriate women's footballers in Spain
UD Granadilla Tenerife players
Primera División (women) players
Orlando Pride players
National Women's Soccer League players
Kansas City Current players
Sanjaxx Lions players